Hydromermis is a genus of Mermithidae.

The genus was described in 1902 by Corti.

Species:
 Hydromermis contorta
 Hydromermis grandis

References

Mermithidae
Enoplea genera